Amatsumara(天津麻羅) is the kami of ironworking and blacksmiths. He is also the patron kami for black smiths.

He acts as a blacksmith for the gods up in Takamagahara. In many versions, he made a mirror with the help of Ishikori-dome, which was used to lure Amaterasu from her hiding place in the rock cave of heaven.

Name 
The name Amatsumara means ma-ura ("eye divination"), which some believe means "one-eyed," in reference to the hazard of blacksmiths.

References 

Shinto
Blacksmiths
Amatsukami